Martin Hickey is an American politician, businessman, and retired physician serving as a member of the New Mexico Senate from the 20th district. Elected in 2020, he assumed office on January 19, 2021.

Early life and education 
Hickey was born in Rockford, Illinois. He earned a Bachelor of Arts degree in social and behavioral health from Johns Hopkins University, a Doctor of Medicine from Rush Medical College, and a Master of Science in preventive and administrative medicine from the University of Wisconsin School of Medicine and Public Health. He completed his residency at the University of Rochester Medical Center.

Career 
Prior to entering politics, Hickey worked as a physician. He is the chairman of the board and CEO of True Health New Mexico, an insurance company. Hickey has also worked as a professor of medicine at the University of New Mexico Hospital. In the Democratic primary for the 20th district in the New Mexico Senate, Hickey placed first in a field of four candidates. He defeated Republican nominee John C. Morton in the November general election. Hickey assumed office on January 19, 2021.

Personal life 
Hickey and his wife, Mary Cunnane, have two grown sons. Cunnane is an OBGYN.

References 

Living people
People from Rockford, Illinois
Johns Hopkins University alumni
Rush Medical College alumni
University of Wisconsin School of Medicine and Public Health alumni
Physicians from New Mexico
Businesspeople from New Mexico
Democratic Party New Mexico state senators
Year of birth missing (living people)